Carlos Bernardo Moreno Lira (born October 28, 1967) is a retired track and field sprinter from Chile, who represented his native country at the 1988 Summer Olympics in Seoul, South Korea.

International competitions

References

1967 births
Living people
Chilean male sprinters
Olympic athletes of Chile
Athletes (track and field) at the 1988 Summer Olympics
Athletes (track and field) at the 1987 Pan American Games
Athletes (track and field) at the 1991 Pan American Games
World Athletics Championships athletes for Chile
Pan American Games competitors for Chile
20th-century Chilean people
21st-century Chilean people